All Souls Church, All Soul's Chapel, and variations, may refer to:

United Kingdom
Church of All Souls, Bolton
All Souls' Church, Halifax
All Souls Church, Hastings
All Souls' Church, Blackman Lane
All Souls Church, Langham Place
All Souls Chapel (Cardiff) (demolished)

United States

All Souls Church (Scott, Arkansas), listed on the NRHP in Arkansas
All Souls Universalist Church (Riverside, California), as listed on the National Register of Historic Places
All Souls Catholic Church (Sanford, Florida), a parish in the Roman Catholic Diocese of Orlando
All Souls Church (Augusta, Maine)
All Souls Congregational Church (Bangor, Maine), listed on the NRHP in Maine
All Souls Chapel (Poland Spring, Maine), listed on the NRHP
All Souls Church (Braintree, Massachusetts)
Unitarian Church of All Souls, New York City, New York
All Souls Church (Tannersville, New York), listed on the NRHP in New York
All Souls Episcopal Church and Parish House (Asheville, North Carolina), listed on the NRHP in North Carolina
All Souls Unitarian-Universalist Church, listed on the NRHP in Ohio
All Souls Unitarian Church, Tulsa, Oklahoma
All Souls Church, Unitarian (Washington, D.C.)
All Souls' Episcopal Church, Belle Isle neighborhood of Miami Beach, Florida

Elsewhere
All Souls' Chapel (Prince Edward Island), a National Historic Site of Canada
All Souls' Church, Cameron Highlands, Pahang, Malaysia